Sven Nilsson may refer to:

Sven Nilsson (zoologist), Swedish zoologist and archaeologist
Sven Nilsson (footballer), Swedish football player and manager
Sven Gösta Nilsson, Swedish theoretical physicist